Stuart John Moore (born 8 September 1994) is an English professional footballer who plays as a goalkeeper for Blackpool. He has previously played for Reading, Hungerford Town, Bashley, Gloucester City, Bath City, Basingstoke Town, Peterborough United, Luton Town, Barrow, Swindon Town, Milton Keynes Dons and Wealdstone.

Career

Reading
Born in Sandown, Isle of Wight, Moore began his career in the youth system at Brading Town before moving to Portsmouth. He then joined Reading in September 2011 at the age of 17 on a three-year scholarship, culminating with a one-year professional contract. Moore joined Southern League Division One South & West club Hungerford Town on loan later that month. He debuted in a replay against Weymouth in the FA Cup second qualifying round, in which he made a number of saves, with Hungerford losing 3–1. The following season saw Moore loaned to Southern League Premier Division club Bashley, finishing the loan with 33 appearances.

On 17 February 2014, Moore joined Conference North club Gloucester City on a one-month loan. He debuted a day later in a 3–1 defeat at home to Barrow. Moore returned to Reading after being recalled from his loan on 14 March, which he finished with four appearances. He was then loaned to Conference South club Bath City on 27 March until the end of 2013–14. Moore made his league debut on 5 April in a 2–1 victory at home to Eastbourne Borough. He was sent off in the 63rd minute of a 3–1 defeat away to Gosport Borough on 19 April for raising his arm in the direction of a Gosport player, which resulted in his suspension for Bath's final matches of the season. Moore completed the loan spell with four appearances. He signed a new one-year contract with Reading ahead of 2014–15. On 7 August 2014, Moore joined Conference South club Basingstoke Town on a season-long loan. He debuted on 23 August in a 2–0 win at home to Hayes & Yeading United. Moore completed the loan spell with 48 appearances, which included both legs of the play-off semi-final defeat to Whitehawk, losing 2–1 on aggregate. He was named as Basingstoke's Player of the Year, voted for by the club's supporters.

On 27 February 2016, Moore joined League One club Peterborough United on a 28-day emergency loan. He debuted later that day in a 2–1 defeat at home to Swindon Town, finishing the loan with four appearances. On 31 January 2017, Moore joined League Two club Luton Town on loan until the end of 2016–17. He debuted later that day in Luton's 3–2 defeat at home to Cheltenham Town. Moore played in both legs of the play-off semi-final defeat to Blackpool, losing 6–5 on aggregate, and completed the loan spell with 10 appearances. He left Reading at the end of 2016–17.

Barrow
On 1 July 2017, Moore signed for National League club Barrow on a one-year contract. He left the club by mutual consent on 22 January 2018, having made 18 appearances.

Swindon Town
Moore signed for League Two club Swindon Town on 27 January 2018 on a contract until the end of 2017–18. He was offered a new contract by Swindon at the end of the 2017–18 season.

Milton Keynes Dons
On 2 August 2018, Moore signed for newly relegated League Two club Milton Keynes Dons. Due to impressive performances, Moore temporarily became first choice goalkeeper for the club and made six league appearances during the successful 2018–19 promotion-winning season. After limited opportunities the  following season, Moore was one of nine players released by Milton Keynes Dons.

Wealdstone
In December 2020, Moore signed for National League club Wealdstone. On 19th December 2020, Moore saved a 96th-minute penalty against Eastleigh to ensure a 4–3 victory and send Wealdstone to the 4th round of the FA Trophy. Moore left the club on 30 January 2021.

Blackpool
On 26 February 2021, Moore joined League One side Blackpool on a contract until the end of the season. He signed a one-year extension on 9 June 2021, with a clause for a possible additional twelve months. On 18 March 2023, Moore joined Doncaster Rovers on an emergency loan deal, making his debut the same day away at Salford City.

Personal life
Moore is the brother of Coventry City goalkeeper Simon Moore. Their father and grandfather were also goalkeepers.

Career statistics

Honours
Reading U21
U21 Premier League Cup: 2013–14

Individual
Basingstoke Town Player of the Year: 2014–15

References

External links
Stuart Moore profile at the Swindon Town F.C. website

1994 births
Living people
People from Sandown
English footballers
Association football goalkeepers
Brading Town F.C. players
Portsmouth F.C. players
Reading F.C. players
Hungerford Town F.C. players
Bashley F.C. players
Gloucester City A.F.C. players
Bath City F.C. players
Basingstoke Town F.C. players
Peterborough United F.C. players
Luton Town F.C. players
Milton Keynes Dons F.C. players
Barrow A.F.C. players
Swindon Town F.C. players
Wealdstone F.C. players
Blackpool F.C. players
Southern Football League players
National League (English football) players
English Football League players